is a group of the Japan Air Self-Defense Force. It consists of the 402nd Tactical Airlift Squadron, based at Iruma Air Base in Saitama Prefecture. It is sometimes referred to as the 2nd Tactical Airlift Wing.

References

Units of the Japan Air Self-Defense Force